Richard Kassebaum (November 15, 1960 – August 27, 2008) was an American documentary filmmaker. He is best remembered for producing television documentaries, including the 2002 award-winning Limited Series Woodrow Wilson and the Birth of the American Century.
Born in Wichita, Kansas, Kassebaum was the son of Republican Senator Nancy Landon Kassebaum. Kassebaum graduated from Maize High School in Maize, Kansas. He received his bachelor's degree in radio and television from Kansas State University and did graduate work in the film school at the University of Southern California. He died from a brain tumor on August 27, 2008 in Knoxville, Tennessee, at the age of 47.

Filmography as a producer
The American Experience - two episodes (2000, 2002)
Woodrow Wilson and the Birth of the American Century (2002)
Kingdom of David: The Saga of the Israelites (2003)

References

External links
 

1960 births
2008 deaths
American documentary filmmakers
People from Wichita, Kansas
Kansas State University alumni
USC School of Cinematic Arts alumni
Deaths from brain cancer in the United States
Landon family